Aivars Pozņaks (born 2 February 1968) is a retired Latvian football striker.

References

1968 births
Living people
Latvian footballers
SK Blāzma players
FC Daugava players
Association football forwards
Latvia international footballers